Eunice Chibanda (born 26 March 1993) is a Zimbabwean association football player. She is a member of the Zimbabwe women's national football team and represented the country in their Olympic debut at the 2016 Summer Olympics. In her first game, she scored an own goal against Germany in a game the Germans won 6–1.

Chibanda was one of six players to be arrested on suspicion of assaulting the referee after a controversial Cup final in July 2014, which her Black Rhinos team lost to Inline Academy after a penalty shootout. The players were acquitted when the Zimbabwe Football Association failed to bring charges within the required seven-day period.

In May 2015 Chibanda was recalled to the national team after a two-year absence, for a 2015 CAF Women's Olympic Qualifying Tournament fixture against Zambia.

References

External links

 

Zimbabwean women's footballers
Zimbabwe women's international footballers
Footballers at the 2016 Summer Olympics
Olympic footballers of Zimbabwe
Living people
1993 births
Women's association football defenders
Women's association football forwards